The Lord Lieutenant of the County of Avon from the creation of the county on 1 April 1974 to its abolition in 1996 was Colonel Sir John Vernon Wills, 4th Baronet, TD, FRICS, JP. He subsequently became Lord Lieutenant of Somerset.

References

Avon (county)
Avon
1974 establishments in England
1996 disestablishments in England